Morse code is a method used in telecommunication to encode text characters as standardized sequences of two different signal durations, called dots and dashes, or dits and dahs. Morse code is named after Samuel Morse, one of the inventors of the telegraph.

International Morse code encodes the 26 basic Latin letters  through , one accented Latin letter, the Arabic numerals, and a small set of punctuation and procedural signals (prosigns). There is no distinction between upper and lower case letters. Each Morse code symbol is formed by a sequence of dits and dahs. The dit duration is the basic unit of time measurement in Morse code transmission. The duration of a dah is three times the duration of a dit. Each dit or dah within an encoded character is followed by a period of signal absence, called a space, equal to the dit duration. The letters of a word are separated by a space of duration equal to three dits, and words are separated by a space equal to seven dits.

Morse code can be memorized and sent in a form perceptible to the human senses, e.g. via sound waves or visible light, such that it can be directly interpreted by persons trained in the skill. Morse code is usually transmitted by on-off keying of an information-carrying medium such as electric current, radio waves, visible light, or sound waves. The current or wave is present during the time period of the dit or dah and absent during the time between dits and dahs.

Since many natural languages use more than the 26 letters of the Latin alphabet, Morse alphabets have been developed for those languages, largely by transliteration of existing codes.

To increase the efficiency of encoding, Morse code was originally designed so that the length of each symbol is approximately inverse to the frequency of occurrence of the character that it represents in text of the English language. Thus the most common letter in English, the letter , has the shortest code – a single dit. Because the Morse code elements are specified by proportion rather than specific time durations, the code is usually transmitted at the highest rate that the receiver is capable of decoding. Morse code transmission rate (speed) is specified in groups per minute, commonly referred to as words per minute.

Development and history

Pre-Morse telegraphs and codes

Early in the nineteenth century, European experimenters made progress with electrical signaling systems, using a variety of techniques including static electricity and electricity from Voltaic piles producing electrochemical and electromagnetic changes. These experimental designs were precursors to practical telegraphic applications.

Following the discovery of electromagnetism by Hans Christian Ørsted in 1820 and the invention of the electromagnet by William Sturgeon in 1824, there were developments in electromagnetic telegraphy in Europe and America. Pulses of electric current were sent along wires to control an electromagnet in the receiving instrument. Many of the earliest telegraph systems used a single-needle system which gave a very simple and robust instrument. However, it was slow, as the receiving operator had to alternate between looking at the needle and writing down the message. In Morse code, a deflection of the needle to the left corresponded to a dit and a deflection to the right to a dah. By making the two clicks sound different with one ivory and one metal stop, the single needle device became an audible instrument, which led in turn to the Double Plate Sounder System.

William Cooke and Charles Wheatstone in Britain developed an electrical telegraph that used electromagnets in its receivers. They obtained an English patent in June 1837 and demonstrated it on the London and Birmingham Railway, making it the first commercial telegraph. Carl Friedrich Gauss and Wilhelm Eduard Weber (1833) as well as Carl August von Steinheil (1837) used codes with varying word lengths for their telegraph systems. In 1841, Cooke and Wheatstone built a telegraph that printed the letters from a wheel of typefaces struck by a hammer.

Samuel Morse and Alfred Vail

The American artist Samuel Morse, the American physicist Joseph Henry, and mechanical engineer Alfred Vail developed an electrical telegraph system. It needed a method to transmit natural language using only electrical pulses and the silence between them. Around 1837, Morse therefore developed an early forerunner to the modern International Morse code.

The Morse system for telegraphy, which was first used in about 1844, was designed to make indentations on a paper tape when electric currents were received. Morse's original telegraph receiver used a mechanical clockwork to move a paper tape. When an electrical current was received, an electromagnet engaged an armature that pushed a stylus onto the moving paper tape, making an indentation on the tape. When the current was interrupted, a spring retracted the stylus and that portion of the moving tape remained unmarked. Morse code was developed so that operators could translate the indentations marked on the paper tape into text messages.

In his earliest design for a code, Morse had planned to transmit only numerals, and to use a codebook to look up each word according to the number which had been sent. However, the code was soon expanded by Alfred Vail in 1840 to include letters and special characters, so it could be used more generally. Vail estimated the frequency of use of letters in the English language by counting the movable type he found in the type-cases of a local newspaper in Morristown, New Jersey. The shorter marks were called "dots" and the longer ones "dashes", and the letters most commonly used were assigned the shortest sequences of dots and dashes. This code, first used in 1844, became known as Morse landline code, American Morse code, or Railroad Morse, until the end of railroad telegraphy in the U.S. in the 1970s.

Operator-led change from graphical to audible code
In the original Morse telegraph system, the receiver's armature made a clicking noise as it moved in and out of position to mark the paper tape. The telegraph operators soon learned that they could translate the clicks directly into dots and dashes, and write these down by hand, thus making the paper tape unnecessary. When Morse code was adapted to radio communication, the dots and dashes were sent as short and long tone pulses. It was later found that people become more proficient at receiving Morse code when it is taught as a language that is heard, instead of one read from a page.

With the advent of tones produced by radiotelegraph receivers, the operators began to vocalize a dot as dit, and a dash as dah, to reflect the sounds of Morse code they heard. To conform to normal sending speed, dits which are not the last element of a code became voiced as di. Morse code was sometimes facetiously known as "iddy-umpty", a dit lampooned as "iddy" and a dah as "umpty", leading to the word "umpteen".

Gerke's refinement of Morse's code 
The Morse code, as specified in the current international standard, International Morse Code Recommendation, ITU-R M.1677-1, was derived from a much-improved proposal by Friedrich Gerke in 1848 that became known as the "Hamburg alphabet".

Gerke changed many of the codepoints, in the process doing away with the different length dashes and different inter-element spaces of American Morse, leaving only two coding elements, the dot and the dash. Gerke's code was adopted in Germany and Austria 1851.

This finally led to the International Morse code in 1865. The International Morse code adopted most of Gerke's codepoints. The original American code being compared dates to 1838; the later American code shown in the table was developed in 1844.

Radiotelegraphy and aviation
In the 1890s, Morse code began to be used extensively for early radio communication before it was possible to transmit voice. In the late 19th and early 20th centuries, most high-speed international communication used Morse code on telegraph lines, undersea cables, and radio circuits.

Although previous transmitters were bulky and the spark gap system of transmission was dangerous and difficult to use, there had been some early attempts: In 1910, the U.S. Navy experimented with sending Morse from an airplane. However the first regular aviation radiotelegraphy was on airships, which had space to accommodate the large, heavy radio equipment then in use. The same year, 1910, a radio on the airship America was instrumental in coordinating the rescue of its crew.

During World War I, Zeppelin airships equipped with radio were used for bombing and naval scouting, and ground-based radio direction finders were used for airship navigation. Allied airships and military aircraft also made some use of radiotelegraphy.

However, there was little aeronautical radio in general use during World War I, and in the 1920s, there was no radio system used by such important flights as that of Charles Lindbergh from New York to Paris in 1927. Once he and the Spirit of St. Louis were off the ground, Lindbergh was truly incommunicado and alone. Morse code in aviation began regular use in the mid-1920s. By 1928, when the first airplane flight was made by the Southern Cross from California to Australia, one of its four crewmen was a radio operator who communicated with ground stations via radio telegraph.

Beginning in the 1930s, both civilian and military pilots were required to be able to use Morse code, both for use with early communications systems and for identification of navigational beacons that transmitted continuous two- or three-letter identifiers in Morse code. Aeronautical charts show the identifier of each navigational aid next to its location on the map.

In addition, rapidly moving field armies could not have fought effectively without radiotelegraphy; they moved more quickly than their communications services could put up new telegraph and telephone lines. This was seen especially in the blitzkrieg offensives of the Nazi German Wehrmacht in Poland, Belgium, France (in 1940), the Soviet Union, and in North Africa; by the British Army in North Africa, Italy, and the Netherlands; and by the U.S. Army in France and Belgium (in 1944), and in southern Germany in 1945.

Maritime flash telegraphy and radio telegraphy 

Radiotelegraphy using Morse code was vital during World War II, especially in carrying messages between the warships and the naval bases of the belligerents. Long-range ship-to-ship communication was by radio telegraphy, using encrypted messages because the voice radio systems on ships then were quite limited in both their range and their security. Radiotelegraphy was also extensively used by warplanes, especially by long-range patrol planes that were sent out by those navies to scout for enemy warships, cargo ships, and troop ships.

Morse code was used as an international standard for maritime distress until 1999 when it was replaced by the Global Maritime Distress and Safety System. When the French Navy ceased using Morse code on January 31, 1997, the final message transmitted was "Calling all. This is our last cry before our eternal silence."

Demise of commercial telegraphy
In the United States the final commercial Morse code transmission was on July 12, 1999, signing off with Samuel Morse's original 1844 message, and the prosign  ("end of contact").

, the United States Air Force still trains ten people a year in Morse.

The United States Coast Guard has ceased all use of Morse code on the radio, and no longer monitors any radio frequencies for Morse code transmissions, including the international medium frequency (MF) distress frequency of  However, the Federal Communications Commission still grants commercial radiotelegraph operator licenses to applicants who pass its code and written tests. Licensees have reactivated the old California coastal Morse station KPH and regularly transmit from the site under either this call sign or as KSM. Similarly, a few U.S. museum ship stations are operated by Morse enthusiasts.

Operator proficiency 

Morse code speed is measured in words per minute or characters per minute. Characters have differing lengths because they contain differing numbers of dits and dahs. Consequently, words also have different lengths in terms of dot duration, even when they contain the same number of characters. Operators skilled in Morse code can often understand ("copy") code in their heads at rates in excess of 40 .

In addition to knowing, understanding, and being able to copy the standard written alpha-numeric and punctuation characters or symbols at high speeds, skilled high speed operators must also be fully knowledgeable of all of the special unwritten Morse code symbols for the standard Prosigns for Morse code and the meanings of these special procedural signals in standard Morse code communications protocol.

International contests in code copying are still occasionally held. In July 1939 at a contest in Asheville, North Carolina in the United States Ted R. McElroy W1JYN set a still-standing record for Morse copying, 75.2 . Pierpont (2004) also notes that some operators may have passed 100 . By this time, they are "hearing" phrases and sentences rather than words. The fastest speed ever sent by a straight key was achieved in 1942 by Harry Turner W9YZE (d. 1992) who reached 35  in a demonstration at a U.S. Army base. To accurately compare code copying speed records of different eras it is useful to keep in mind that different standard words (50 dit durations versus 60 dit durations) and different interword gaps (5 dit durations versus 7 dit durations) may have been used when determining such speed records. For example, speeds run with the  standard word and the  standard may differ by up to 20%.

Today among amateur operators there are several organizations that recognize high-speed code ability, one group consisting of those who can copy Morse at 60 . Also, Certificates of Code Proficiency are issued by several amateur radio societies, including the American Radio Relay League. Their basic award starts at 10  with endorsements as high as 40 , and are available to anyone who can copy the transmitted text. Members of the Boy Scouts of America may put a Morse interpreter's strip on their uniforms if they meet the standards for translating code at 5 .

Through May 2013, the First, Second, and Third Class (commercial) Radiotelegraph Licenses using code tests based upon the  standard word were still being issued in the United States by the Federal Communications Commission. The First Class license required 20  code group and 25  text code proficiency, the others 16  code group test (five letter blocks sent as simulation of receiving encrypted text) and 20  code text (plain language) test. It was also necessary to pass written tests on operating practice and electronics theory. A unique additional demand for the First Class was a requirement of a year of experience for operators of shipboard and coast stations using Morse. This allowed the holder to be chief operator on board a passenger ship. However, since 1999 the use of satellite and very high-frequency maritime communications systems (GMDSS) has made them obsolete. (By that point meeting experience requirement for the First was very difficult.)

Currently, only one class of license, the Radiotelegraph Operator License, is issued. This is granted either when the tests are passed or as the Second and First are renewed and become this lifetime license. For new applicants, it requires passing a written examination on electronic theory and radiotelegraphy practices, as well as 16  code-group and 20  text tests. However, the code exams are currently waived for holders of Amateur Extra Class licenses who obtained their operating privileges under the old 20  test requirement.

International Morse code 
Morse code has been in use for more than 160 years — longer than any other electrical coding system. What is called Morse code today is actually somewhat different from what was originally developed by Vail and Morse. The Modern International Morse code, or continental code, was created by Friedrich Clemens Gerke in 1848 and initially used for telegraphy between Hamburg and Cuxhaven in Germany. Gerke changed nearly half of the alphabet and all of the numerals, providing the foundation for the modern form of the code. After some minor changes, International Morse Code was standardized at the International Telegraphy Congress in 1865 in Paris and was later made the standard by the International Telecommunication Union (ITU). Morse's original code specification, largely limited to use in the United States and Canada, became known as American Morse code or "railroad code". American Morse code is now seldom used except in historical re-enactments.

Aviation

In aviation, pilots use radio navigation aids. To ensure that the stations the pilots are using are serviceable, the stations transmit a set of identification letters (usually a two-to-five-letter version of the station name) in Morse code. Station identification letters are shown on air navigation charts. For example, the VOR-DME based at Vilo Acuña Airport in Cayo Largo del Sur, Cuba is coded as "UCL", and UCL in Morse code is transmitted on its radio frequency. In some countries, during periods of maintenance, the facility may radiate a T-E-S-T code or the code may be removed which tells pilots and navigators that the station is unreliable. In Canada, the identification is removed entirely to signify the navigation aid is not to be used. In the aviation service, Morse is typically sent at a very slow speed of about 5 words per minute. In the U.S., pilots do not actually have to know Morse to identify the transmitter because the dot/dash sequence is written out next to the transmitter's symbol on aeronautical charts. Some modern navigation receivers automatically translate the code into displayed letters.

Amateur radio

International Morse code today is most popular among amateur radio operators, in the mode commonly referred to as "continuous wave" or "CW". (This name was chosen to distinguish it from the damped wave emissions from spark transmitters, not because the transmission is continuous.) Other keying methods are available in radio telegraphy, such as frequency-shift keying.

The original amateur radio operators used Morse code exclusively since voice-capable radio transmitters did not become commonly available until around 1920. Until 2003, the International Telecommunication Union mandated Morse code proficiency as part of the amateur radio licensing procedure worldwide. However, the World Radiocommunication Conference of 2003 made the Morse code requirement for amateur radio licensing optional. Many countries subsequently removed the Morse requirement from their licence requirements.

Until 1991, a demonstration of the ability to send and receive Morse code at a minimum of five words per minute was required to receive an amateur radio license for use in the United States from the Federal Communications Commission. Demonstration of this ability was still required for the privilege to use the HF bands. Until 2000, proficiency at the 20  level was required to receive the highest level of amateur license (Amateur Extra Class); effective April 15, 2000, the FCC reduced the Extra Class requirement to 5 . Finally, effective on February 23, 2007, the FCC eliminated the Morse code proficiency requirements from all amateur radio licenses.

While voice and data transmissions are limited to specific amateur radio bands under U.S. rules, Morse code is permitted on all amateur bands — LF, MF, HF, VHF, and UHF. In some countries, certain portions of the amateur radio bands are reserved for transmission of Morse code signals only.

Because Morse code transmissions employ an on-off keyed radio signal, it requires less complex transmission equipment than other forms of radio communication. Morse code also requires less signal bandwidth than voice communication, typically 100–150 Hz, compared to the roughly 2,400 Hz used by single-sideband voice, although at a slower data rate.

Morse code is usually received as a high-pitched audio tone, so transmissions are easier to copy than voice through the noise on congested frequencies, and it can be used in very high noise / low signal environments. The fact that the transmitted power is concentrated into a very limited bandwidth makes it possible to use narrow receiver filters, which suppress or eliminate interference on nearby frequencies. The narrow signal bandwidth also takes advantage of the natural aural selectivity of the human brain, further enhancing weak signal readability. This efficiency makes CW extremely useful for DX (distance) transmissions, as well as for low-power transmissions (commonly called "QRP operation", from the Q-code for "reduce power"). There are several amateur clubs that require solid high speed copy, the highest of these has a standard of 60 . The American Radio Relay League offers a code proficiency certification program that starts at 10 .

The relatively limited speed at which Morse code can be sent led to the development of an extensive number of abbreviations to speed communication. These include prosigns, Q codes, and a set of Morse code abbreviations for typical message components. For example,  is broadcast to be interpreted as "seek you" (I'd like to converse with anyone who can hear my signal). The use of abbreviations for common terms permits conversation even when the operators speak different languages.

Although the traditional telegraph key (straight key) is still used by some amateurs, the use of mechanical semi-automatic keyers (known as "bugs") and of fully automatic electronic keyers is prevalent today. Software is also frequently employed to produce and decode Morse code radio signals. The ARRL has a readability standard for robot encoders called ARRL Farnsworth spacing that is supposed to have higher readability for both robot and human decoders. Some programs like WinMorse have implemented the standard.

Other uses
Radio navigation aids such as VORs and NDBs for aeronautical use broadcast identifying information in the form of Morse Code, though many VOR stations now also provide voice identification. Warships, including those of the U.S. Navy, have long used signal lamps to exchange messages in Morse code. Modern use continues, in part, as a way to communicate while maintaining radio silence.

Automatic Transmitter Identification System (ATIS) uses Morse code to identify uplink sources of analog satellite transmissions.

Many amateur radio repeaters identify with Morse, even though they are used for voice communications.

Applications for the general public

An important application is signalling for help through SOS, "". This can be sent many ways: keying a radio on and off, flashing a mirror, toggling a flashlight, and similar methods. The SOS signal is not sent as three separate characters; rather, it is a prosign , and is keyed without gaps between characters.

Some Nokia mobile phones offer an option to alert the user of an incoming text message with the Morse tone "" (representing SMS or Short Message Service). In addition, applications are now available for mobile phones that enable short messages to be input in Morse Code.

Morse code as an assistive technology
Morse code has been employed as an assistive technology, helping people with a variety of disabilities to communicate. For example, the Android operating system versions 5.0 and higher allow users to input text using Morse Code as an alternative to a keypad or handwriting recognition.

Morse can be sent by persons with severe motion disabilities, as long as they have some minimal motor control. An original solution to the problem that caretakers have to learn to decode has been an electronic typewriter with the codes written on the keys. Codes were sung by users; see the voice typewriter employing Morse or votem.

Morse code can also be translated by computer and used in a speaking communication aid. In some cases, this means alternately blowing into and sucking on a plastic tube ("sip-and-puff" interface). An important advantage of Morse code over row column scanning is that once learned, it does not require looking at a display. Also, it appears faster than scanning.

In one case reported in the radio amateur magazine QST, an old shipboard radio operator who had a stroke and lost the ability to speak or write could communicate with his physician (a radio amateur) by blinking his eyes in Morse. Two examples of communication in intensive care units were also published in QST magazine. Another example occurred in 1966 when prisoner of war Jeremiah Denton, brought on television by his North Vietnamese captors, Morse-blinked the word . In these two cases, interpreters were available to understand those series of eye-blinks.

Representation, timing, and speeds

International Morse code is composed of five elements:

 short mark, dot or dit: "dit duration" is one time unit long
 long mark, dash or dah: three time units long
 inter-element gap between the dits and dahs within a character: one dot duration or one unit long
 short gap (between letters): three time units long
 medium gap (between words): seven time units long (formerly five)

Transmission
Morse code can be transmitted in a number of ways: Originally as electrical pulses along a telegraph wire, but later extended to an audio tone, a radio signal with short and long tones, or high and low tones, or as a mechanical, audible, or visual signal (e.g. a flashing light) using devices like an Aldis lamp or a heliograph, a common flashlight, or even a car horn. Some mine rescues have used pulling on a rope - a short pull for a dot and a long pull for a dah.

Morse code is transmitted using just two states (on and off). Morse code may be represented as a binary code, and that is what telegraph operators do when transmitting messages. Working from the above ITU definition and further defining a bit as a dot time, a Morse code sequence may be made from a combination of the following five bit-strings:

 short mark, dot or dit: 1
 longer mark, dash or dah: 111
 intra-character gap (between the dits and dahs within a character): 0
 short gap (between letters): 000
 medium gap (between words): 0000000

Note that the marks and gaps alternate: Dits and dahs are always separated by one of the gaps, and that the gaps are always separated by a dit or a dah.

Morse messages are generally transmitted by a hand-operated device such as a telegraph key, so there are variations introduced by the skill of the sender and receiver — more experienced operators can send and receive at faster speeds. In addition, individual operators differ slightly, for example, using slightly longer or shorter dahs or gaps, perhaps only for particular characters. This is called their "fist", and experienced operators can recognize specific individuals by it alone. A good operator who sends clearly and is easy to copy is said to have a "good fist". A "poor fist" is a characteristic of sloppy or hard to copy Morse code.

Cable code
The very long time constants of 19th and early 20th century submarine communications cables required a different form of Morse signalling. Instead of keying a voltage on and off for varying times, the dits and dahs were represented by two polarities of voltage impressed on the cable, for a uniform time.

Timing
Below is an illustration of timing conventions. The phrase , in Morse code format, would normally be written something like this, where  represents dahs and  represents dits:

 −− −−− ·−· ··· ·       −·−· −−− −·· ·
 M   O   R   S  E        C    O   D  E

Next is the exact conventional timing for this phrase, with  representing "signal on", and  representing "signal off", each for the time length of exactly one dit:

Spoken representation
Morse code is often spoken or written with dah for dashes, dit for dots located at the end of a character, and di for dots located at the beginning or internally within the character. Thus, the following Morse code sequence:

is spoken (or sung):

For use on radio, there is little point in learning to read written Morse as above; rather, the sounds of all of the letters and symbols need to be learned, for both sending and receiving.

Speed in words per minute
All Morse code elements depend on the dot / dit length. A dah is the length of 3 dits (with no gaps between), and spacings are specified in number of dit lengths. An unambiguous method of specifying the transmission speed is to specify the dit duration as, for example, 50 milliseconds.

Specifying the dit duration is, however, not the common practice. Usually, speeds are stated in words per minute. That introduces ambiguity because words have different numbers of characters, and characters have different dit lengths. It is not immediately clear how a specific word rate determines the dit duration in milliseconds.

Some method to standardize the transformation of a word rate to a dit duration is useful. A simple way to do this is to choose a dit duration that would send a typical word the desired number of times in one minute. If, for example, the operator wanted a character speed of 13 words per minute, the operator would choose a dit rate that would send the typical word 13 times in exactly one minute.

The typical word thus determines the dit length. It is common to assume that a word is 5 characters long. Using the word  as a standard, the number of dit units is 50 and a simple calculation shows that the dit length at 20 words per minute is 60 milliseconds. Using the word  with 60 dit units, the dit length at 20 words per minute is 50 milliseconds.

Because Morse code is usually sent by hand, it is unlikely that an operator could be that precise with the dit length, and the individual characteristics and preferences of the operators usually override the standards.

For commercial radiotelegraph licenses in the United States, the Federal Communications Commission specifies tests for Morse code proficiency in words per minute and in code groups per minute. The FCC specifies that a "word" is 5 characters long. The Commission specifies Morse code test elements at 16 code groups per minute, 20 words per minute, 20 code groups per minute, and 25 words per minute. The word per minute rate would be close to the  standard, and the code groups per minute would be close to the  standard.

While the Federal Communications Commission no longer requires Morse code for amateur radio licenses, the old requirements were similar to the requirements for commercial radiotelegraph licenses.

A difference between amateur radio licenses and commercial radiotelegraph licenses is that commercial operators must be able to receive code groups of random characters along with plain language text. For each class of license, the code group speed requirement is slower than the plain language text requirement. For example, for the Radiotelegraph Operator License, the examinee must pass a 20 word per minute plain text test and a 16 word per minute code group test.

High-speed telegraphy contests are held; according to the Guinness Book of Records in June 2005 at the International Amateur Radio Union's 6th World Championship in High Speed Telegraphy in Primorsko, Bulgaria, Andrei Bindasov of Belarus transmitted 230 Morse code marks of mixed text in one minute.

Farnsworth speed
Sometimes, especially while teaching Morse code, the timing rules above are changed so two different speeds are used: A character speed and a text speed. The character speed is how fast each individual letter is sent. The text speed is how fast the entire message is sent. For example, individual characters may be sent at a 13 words-per-minute rate, but the intercharacter and interword gaps may be lengthened so the word rate is only 5 words per minute.

Using different character and text speeds is, in fact, a common practice, and is used in the Farnsworth method of learning Morse code.

Alternative display of common characters in International Morse code

Some methods of teaching Morse code use a dichotomic search table.

Learning methods 
People learning Morse code using the Farnsworth method are taught to send and receive letters and other symbols at their full target speed, that is with normal relative timing of the dits, dahs, and spaces within each symbol for that speed. The Farnsworth method is named for Donald R. "Russ" Farnsworth, also known by his call sign, W6TTB. However, initially exaggerated spaces between symbols and words are used, to give "thinking time" to make the sound "shape" of the letters and symbols easier to learn. The spacing can then be reduced with practice and familiarity.

Another popular teaching method is the Koch method, invented in 1935 by the German engineer and former stormtrooper Ludwig Koch, which uses the full target speed from the outset but begins with just two characters. Once strings containing those two characters can be copied with 90% accuracy, an additional character is added, and so on until the full character set is mastered.

In North America, many thousands of individuals have increased their code recognition speed (after initial memorization of the characters) by listening to the regularly scheduled code practice transmissions broadcast by W1AW, the American Radio Relay League's headquarters station.  the United States military taught Morse code as an 81-day self-paced course, having phased out more traditional classes.

Mnemonics 

Visual mnemonic charts have been devised over the ages. Baden-Powell included one in the Girl Guides handbook in 1918.

In the United Kingdom, many people learned the Morse code by means of a series of words or phrases that have the same rhythm as a Morse character.

Letters, numbers, punctuation, prosigns for Morse code and non-Latin variants

Prosigns 

Prosigns for Morse code are special (usually) unwritten procedural signals or symbols that are used to indicate changes in communications protocol status or white space text formatting actions.

Symbol representations 
The symbols [!], [$], and [&] are not defined inside the official ITU-R International Morse Code Recommendation, but informal conventions for them exist. (The [@] symbol was formally added in 2004.)

 Exclamation mark  There is no standard representation for the exclamation mark [!], although the  digraph was proposed in the 1980s by the Heathkit Company. While Morse code translation software prefers the Heathkit version, on-air use is not yet universal as some amateur radio operators in North America and the Caribbean continue to use the older  digraph copied over from American Morse landline code.
 Currency symbols  The ITU has never formally codified any currency symbols into Morse code: The unambiguous ISO 4217 currency codes are preferred for transmission.
 The [$] sign code was represented in the Phillips Code as two characters "", which became merged into .
 Keyboard "at" sign [@]  On 24 May 2004 – the 160th anniversary of the first public Morse telegraph transmission – the Radiocommunication Bureau of the International Telecommunication Union (ITU-R) formally added the [@] ("commercial at" or "commat") character to the official Morse character set, using the sequence denoted by the  digraph:  .
 This sequence was reported to have been chosen to represent "A[t] C[ommercial]", or a letter "a" inside a swirl represented by a letter "C". The new character facilitates sending e‑mail addresses by Morse code, and is notable since it is the first official addition to the Morse set of characters since World War I.

Diacritics and non-Latin extensions 

The typical tactic for creating Morse codes for diacritics and non-Latin alphabetic scripts has been to begin by simply using the International Morse codes used for letters whose sound matches the sound of the local alphabet. Because Gerke code (the predecessor to International Morse) was in official use in central Europe, and included three characters (Ä, Ö and Ü not included in the International Morse standard) it has served as a beginning-point for other languages that use an alphabetic script, but require codes for letters not accommodated by International Morse.

The usual method has been to first transliterate the sounds represented by the International code into the local alphabet, hence Greek, Hebrew, Russian, and Ukrainian Morse codes. If more codes are needed, one can either invent a new code or convert an otherwise unused code from either code set to the non-Latin letter. For example:
 For the Greek letter Ψ, Greek Morse code uses the International Morse code for Q, which has no corresponding letter in Greek, even though Ψ and Q have no historical, phonetic, or shape relationship.

For Russian and Bulgarian, Russian Morse code is used to map the Cyrillic characters to four-element codes. Many of the characters are encoded the same way (A, O, E, I, T, M, N, R, K, etc.). The Bulgarian alphabet contains 30 characters, which exactly match all possible combinations of 1, 2, 3, and 4 dits and dahs (Russian  is used as Bulgarian , Russian  is used as Bulgarian ). Russian requires two more codes, for letters Э and Ъ which are each encoded with 5 elements.

Non-alphabetic scripts require more radical adaption. Japanese Morse code (Wabun code) has a separate encoding for kana script; although many of the codes are used for International Morse, the sounds they represent are mostly unrelated.

For Chinese, Chinese telegraph code is used to map Chinese characters to four-digit codes and send these digits out using standard Morse code. Korean Morse code uses the SKATS mapping, originally developed to allow Korean to be typed on western typewriters. SKATS maps hangul characters to arbitrary letters of the Latin script and has no relationship to pronunciation in Korean.

Unusual variants 
During early World War I (1914–1916), Germany briefly experimented with 'dotty' and 'dashy' Morse, in essence adding a dot or a dash at the end of each Morse symbol. Each one was quickly broken by Allied SIGINT, and standard Morse was restored by Spring 1916. Only a small percentage of Western Front (North Atlantic and Mediterranean Sea) traffic was in 'dotty' or 'dashy' Morse during the entire war. In popular culture, this is mostly remembered in the book The Codebreakers by Kahn and in the national archives of the UK and Australia (whose SIGINT operators copied most of this Morse variant). Kahn's cited sources come from the popular press and wireless magazines of the time.

Other forms of Fractional Morse or Fractionated Morse have emerged.

Decoding software
Decoding software for Morse code ranges from software-defined wide-band radio receivers, coupled to the Reverse Beacon Network, which decodes signals and detects  messages on ham bands, to smartphone applications.

See also

Footnotes

References

External links

 

 

  — 200 hours of at increasing speeds plus an ASCII-to-CW file generator program.

  Archived at Ghostarchive and the Wayback Machine:

 

 

 
American inventions
Latin-script representations
1848 introductions
Scoutcraft
Amateur radio